Pseudargyria parallelus is a moth in the family Crambidae. It was described by Zeller in 1867. It is found in India (Darjeeling).

References

Crambinae
Moths described in 1867